Outside is a 2004 short film written and directed by Jenn Kao and starring Courtney Ford.

The film won the Best Science Fiction/Fantasy Film award at the 2006 Comic-Con Independent Film Festival and a 2005 DGA Student Directing Award. The film has screened at over 30 film festivals.

Plot
In post-apocalyptic society, people are isolated in sealed bunkers. A young woman is forced to confront her fears of the unknown when she makes contact with an Outsider.

Production
Outside was produced at the UCLA School of Theater Film and Television. It was writer/director Jenn Kao's MFA thesis film.

Reviews
FilmThreat.com critic Doug Brunnel gave Outside 4 stars and called it "utterly captivating...a great film."

Variety critic Tom McClean, part of the jury that named Outside Best Science Fiction/Fantasy Film at the 2006 Comic-Con International Film Festival, said that Outside was "like one of those great high concept sci-fi films of the 1970s".

Details
 Shooting format: 35mm film
 Running Time: 22 minutes

References

External links
 Official Movie Site

2004 films
2004 short films
American short films
2000s English-language films